Scott Auer (born October 4, 1961) is a former American football guard and tackle. He played for the Kansas City Chiefs from 1984 to 1985.

References

1961 births
Living people
American football offensive guards
American football offensive tackles
Michigan State Spartans football players
Kansas City Chiefs players